Terence Devin Kernaghan is a Canadian politician, who was elected to the Legislative Assembly of Ontario in the 2018 provincial election. He represents the electoral district of London North Centre as a member of the Ontario New Democratic Party.

He is the first openly gay MPP to be elected to the legislature from the city of London.

Election results

References

Living people
21st-century Canadian politicians
Canadian LGBT people in provincial and territorial legislatures
Gay politicians
Ontario New Democratic Party MPPs
Politicians from London, Ontario
University of Western Ontario alumni
Year of birth missing (living people)
21st-century Canadian LGBT people
Canadian gay men